Don't Wait Up is the fourth and final studio album by American hardcore punk band Bane. It is their  first studio album in 9 years.

Track listing
 "Non-Negotiable" – 2:36
 "All the Way Through" – 3:16
 "Calling Hours" (featuring Patrick Flynn of Have Heart, Walter Delgado of Rotting Out, David Wood of Down to Nothing and Reba Meyers of Code Orange) – 5:00
 "Park St." – 2:20
 "What Awaits Us Now" – 1:27
 "Hard to Find" – 3:04
 "Lost at Sea" – 2:18
 "Post Hoc" – 2:29
 "Wrong Planet" – 4:18
 "Final Backwards Glance" – 4:22

Band members
Aaron Bedard – vocals
Aaron Dalbec – guitar, vocals
Zach Jordan – guitar, vocals
Pete Chilton – bass, vocals
Bob Mahoney – drums, vocals

References

External links
Equal Vision Records

Bane (band) albums
2014 albums
Equal Vision Records albums